(4953) 1990 MU is a large Earth-crossing asteroid (ECA) belonging to the Apollo group of near-Earth objects which also cross the orbits of Mars and Venus.  At approximately 3 km in diameter, it is one of the largest known ECAs. It has been assigned a permanent number from the Minor Planet Center (4953) indicating that its orbit has been very well determined. With an observation arc of 45 years, the asteroid's trajectory and uncertainty regions are well known through to the year 2186.

Description 

 was first observed over three nights in 1990.  By itself, this was not enough for the asteroid to be given a permanent number since the orbit could not be calculated accurately enough for the object to be subsequently recovered.  However, the object was precovered by the Anglo-Australian Near-Earth Asteroid Survey on six photographic plates from the UK Schmidt Telescope dating back to 1974.  This technique has more success with the Amor group of asteroids which do not cross the orbit of the Earth and consequently have long periods of opposition when they can be observed.  In this respect the Apollo asteroid  is somewhat unusual.

The Earth MOID of  has been decreasing (becoming more hazardous) during the 20th century, while the Venus MOID (0.0455) has been increasing.

Besides its original discovery at Siding Spring Observatory in Australia,  has also been studied by radar at Goldstone Observatory in California, and Arecibo Observatory in Puerto Rico. Lightcurves have been obtained at La Silla Observatory in Chile.

The result obtained was 0.79 and was the second highest albedo measured by the project. However, ExploreNEO do not believe this is a plausible figure, they state that the albedo of an NEO is not likely to be much over 0.5 and their measurement uncertainty is "around a factor of 2".

The Gaia mission of the European Space Agency, launched in December 2013, has been tasked with measuring the Yarkovsky effect on near-Earth asteroids (NEAs). The Yarkovsky effect is a small non-gravitational force on rotating bodies that can affect their trajectories. Its effect on small bodies like asteroids can be significant and needs to be taken into account in predicting an asteroid's position.  has been selected as one of the most promising NEAs for this measurement by Gaia.

See also 
 List of Mars-crossing minor planets
 List of Venus-crossing minor planets

References

External links 
 
 
 

004953
004953
004953
Discoveries by Robert H. McNaught
004953
19900623